Kotoe (written:  or ) is a feminine Japanese given name. Notable people with the name include:

, Japanese volleyball player
, Japanese figure skater and coach

Japanese feminine given names